Cat's Ash is a small hamlet to the east of the city centre of the city of Newport, South East Wales.

The placename in both English and Welsh refers to ash trees.

The Usk Valley Walk passes close by.

External links 
Photos of Cat's Ash and surrounding area on geograph.org.uk

Districts of Newport, Wales